Beaconsfield is a city in Ringgold County, Iowa, United States. The population was 15 in the 2020 census, unchanged from 2010 and an increase from 11 in 2000. In the 2000 census Beaconsfield was the least populated incorporated city in Iowa; with the increase in the 2020 census, it is now the second smallest, after with Le Roy.

History 
Beaconsfield started when the Humeston and Shenandoah Railroad built a train station. In 1881 a town company laid it out as a village. A post office was established in 1882 and closed in 1993.

The town was incorporated on January 18, 1990.

The community was named after Lord Beaconsfield of England.

The Hy-Vee grocery chain has its origin in the Beaconsfield Supply Store, a general store opened by Charles Hyde and David Vredenburg in 1930. That location is on the National Register of Historic Places.

On May 23, 1981, a tornado touched down southwest of Beaconsfield for 15.9 miles. It was rated F2

Geography
Beaconsfield's longitude and latitude are 40.807958, -94.050634.

The elevation of Beaconsfield is 1210 feet above sea level.

Climate

According to the Köppen Climate Classification system, Beaconsfield has a hot-summer humid continental climate, abbreviated "Dfa" on climate maps.

Demographics

2010 census
As of the census of 2010, there were 15 people, 8 households, and 5 families living in the city. The racial makup of the city was 100.0% White.

There were 8 households, of which 62.5% were married couples living together and 37.5% were non-families. 37.5% of households were one person and 25% were one person aged 65 or older. The average household size was 1.88 and the average family size was 2.40.

The median age was 55.5 years. 0.0% of residents were under the age of 18; 6.7% (1) between the ages of 18 and 24; 13.3% (2) from 25 to 44; 40% (6) were from 45 to 64; and 40% (6) were 65 or older. The gender makeup of the city was 46.7% male and 53.3% female.

2000 census
As of the census of 2000, there were 11 people, 7 households, and 3 families living in the city. The population density was 15.2 people per square mile (5.9/km). There were 13 housing units at an average density of 18.0 per square mile (7.0/km). The racial makup of the city was 100.00% White.

There were 7 households, out of which none had children under the age of 18 living with them, 57.1% were married couples living together, and 42.9% were non-families. 42.9% of households were one person and 42.9% were one person aged 65 or older. The average household size was 1.57 and the average family size was 2.00.

Population spread: 9.1% from 45 to 64, and 90.9% 65 or older. The median age was 70 years. For every 100 females, there were 57.1 males. For every 100 females age 18 and over, there were 57.1 males.

The median household income was $10,833 and the median family income  was $11,667. Males had a median income of $0 versus $0 for females. The per capita income for the city was $5,990. There were no families and 20.0% of the population living below the poverty line, including no under eighteens and 20.0% of those over 64.

Education
Mount Ayr Community School District operates public schools serving the community.

Notable person 

 Peggy Whitson (1960– ) astronaut on three expeditions, from October 2009 to September 2017, held the office of The Chief Astronaut.

References

External links 

IAGenWeb Project History, information and more for Ringgold County

Cities in Iowa
Cities in Ringgold County, Iowa
Populated places established in 1881
1881 establishments in Iowa